The Boltysh crater or Bovtyshka crater is a buried impact crater in the Kirovohrad Oblast of Ukraine, near the village of Bovtyshka. The Chicxulub impact is believed to have caused the mass extinction at the end of the Cretaceous period, which included the extinction of the non-avian dinosaurs. The Boltysh crater is currently thought to be unrelated to the Chicxulub impact, and to have not generated major global environmental effects.

Overview 
Boltysh crater is located in central Ukraine, in the basin of the Tiasmyn River, a tributary of the Dnieper River.

Age 
The Boltysh depression was identified as a fossil meteorite crater by 1975. By 1987, it was dated to 100 ± 12 million years old. Early age estimates could only be roughly constrained between the age of the impacted rocks (the target) and the age of overlying sediments. The target rocks date from the Cenomanian (98.9 to 93.5 million years ago) and Turonian (93.5 to 89 million years ago) epochs. Bore samples of sediments overlying the crater contain fossils dating from the Paleocene epoch, 66 to 54.8 million years ago. The age of the crater was thus constrained to between 54 and 98 million years.

Subsequent radiometric dating reduced the uncertainty. The concentration of  decay products in impact glasses from the crater were used to derive an age of 65.04 ± 1.10 million years. A 2002  analysis of argon radioactive decay products yielded an age of 65.17 ± 0.64 million years. While these radiometric dating measurements place the Boltysh crater hundreds of thousands of years after the Chicxulub crater, a 2010 radiometric and palynological study of fern spore (fern spikes) abundance suggested the Boltysh impact may have occurred several thousand years before Chicxulub. However, in response, a follow-up study in 2021 estimated using argon–argon dating that Boltysh formed about 65.39 ± 0.14/0.16 million years ago, 650,000 years after the Chicxulub catastrophe, and suggested that the fern spike was plausibly a result of the impact itself. The authors of the paper suggested that the impact may have disrupted recovery after the K/Pg extinction.

References

Further reading 
 Grieve, R. A. F., Reny, G., Gurov, E. P., & Ryabenko, V. A. (1987). The melt rocks of the Boltysh impact crater, Ukraine, USSR. Contributions to Mineralogy and Petrology, 96(1), 56–62.
 Grieve R.A.F., Reny G., Gurov, E.P., Ryabenko V. A. (1985), Impact Melt Rocks of the Boltysh Crater, Meteoritics, v. 20, p. 655
 Gurov, E. P., Kelley, S. P., Koeberl, C., & Dykan, N. I. (2006). Sediments and impact rocks filling the Boltysh impact crater. In Biological processes associated with impact events (pp. 335–358). Springer Berlin Heidelberg.
 Gurov E.P., Gurova H.P. (1985), Boltysh Astrobleme: Impact Crater Pattern with a Central Uplift, Lunar & Planetary Science XVI, pp. 310–311
 Jolley D., Gilmour I., Gurov E., Kelley S., Watson J. (2010) Two large meteorite impacts at the Cretaceous-Paleogene boundary  Geology September 2010, v. 38, pp. 835–838, 
 Kashkarov L.L., Nazarov M.A., Lorents K.A., Kalinina G.V., Kononkova N.N. (1999), The Track Age of the Boltysh Impact Structure, Astronomicheskii Vestnik, v. 33, p. 253
 Kelley S.P., Gurov E. (2002), The Boltysh, another end-Cretaceous impact, Meteoritics & Planetary Science, v. 37, pp. 1031–1043

Impact craters of Ukraine
Paleocene impact craters
Geography of Kirovohrad Oblast